Cerrito is a Brazilian municipality in the southern part of the state of Rio Grande do Sul. The population is 6,047 (2020 est.) in an area of 451.70 km2. The municipality was formed in 1997 from part of the municipality Pedro Osório.

Bounding municipalities
Pedro Osório, southwest

Mayors

References

External links
 Official website of the prefecture
 https://web.archive.org/web/20071117014913/http://www.citybrazil.com.br/rs/cerrito/ 

Municipalities in Rio Grande do Sul
Pelotas (micro-region)